Mark Andrew "Barney" Greenway (born 13 July 1969) is a British extreme metal vocalist  who is the current lead singer of Napalm Death and a former member of Extreme Noise Terror and Benediction.

Greenway has stated his nickname "Barney" came from a time when he used to drink alcohol. He stated he would get so drunk that when he went anywhere, he would bump into everything. From this behaviour, his friend Stick (drummer of Doom) would call him "Rubble", which changed to "Barney Rubble" and then just "Barney".

Career 

Greenway was initially the vocalist of death metal band Benediction from 1989 until he joined Napalm Death the following year, replacing the band's previous vocalist Lee Dorrian, who later founded doom metal band Cathedral. Prior to joining Napalm Death, Greenway had worked as an engineer within the motor industry in Birmingham.

Greenway's first album with Napalm Death, Harmony Corruption represented a shift in the band's musical style, incorporating a more death metal-oriented sound. The albums that followed this, including Utopia Banished, Fear, Emptiness, Despair and Diatribes saw the band delve further into the aforementioned style whilst also incorporating elements of groove metal.

Greenway and Napalm Death parted ways in 1996, with bassist Shane Embury referring to the long unrest that had been present between Greenway and the remainder of the band. Greenway later joined Extreme Noise Terror to record vocals on their album Damage 381, with Extreme Noise Terror's vocalist Phil Vane joining Napalm Death to record vocals on their album Inside the Torn Apart. Vane and Napalm Death however were incompatible according to Embury, and after discussions between Greenway and the band, Greenway returned to record the vocals for the above album.

Greenway has remained with Napalm Death since 1997 and have since released a number of critically acclaimed albums.

Personal life 
Greenway is a progressive metal fan. He joined Dream Theater on stage at Ronnie Scott's Jazz Club and performed vocals on Metallica's "Damage, Inc." live. He has reviewed progressive metal bands and albums for the British rock magazine Kerrang! though he no longer does so. He has also stated his admiration for bands such as Motörhead and Throbbing Gristle, stating that the former's album, Ace of Spades, is his all-time favourite album. Greenway is also a voracious reader.

Greenway is a supporter of Aston Villa F.C. He is a supporter of many animal rights organisations including PETA; he has been a vegetarian since he was 14, and vegan since 2012. Greenway is recognisable for his strong Birmingham accent and for his distinctive gruff vocal style which many feel has become synonymous with Napalm Death. Greenway is an atheist.

Discography

With Napalm Death
Harmony Corruption (1990)
Utopia Banished (1992)
Fear, Emptiness, Despair (1994)
Diatribes (1996)
Inside the Torn Apart (1997)
Words from the Exit Wound (1998)
Enemy of the Music Business (2000)
Order of the Leech (2002)
The Code Is Red...Long Live the Code (2005)
Smear Campaign (2006)
Time Waits for No Slave (2009)
Utilitarian (2012)
Apex Predator – Easy Meat (2015)
Throes of Joy in the Jaws of Defeatism (2020)
 Resentment is Always Seismic (2022)

With Benediction
 The Dreams You Dread
 Confess All Goodness (1990, Split-EP with Pungent Stench)
 Subconscious Terror (1990)
 Dark Is the Season (1992) (on the track "Forged in Fire")

With Extreme Noise Terror
 Damage 381 (1997)

Other appearances 
 Cerebral Fix – Death Erotica – backing vocals on "Never Again"
 Leng Tch'e – Hypomanic – Guest vocals on "Totalitarian"
 The Haunted – Revolver – cameo appearance on "No Compromise" music video
 Cephalic Carnage – Anomalies – backing vocals
 Ginger – A Break in the Weather – backing vocals on "The Dying Art of the Chorus"
 Dream Theater – International Fan Club Christmas CD – vocals on cover of Metallica's "Damage Inc."
 Withered – Foile Circulare – backing vocals on "...The Faded Breath" and "Clamor Beneath"
 This Is Menace – The Scene Is Dead – vocals on "Beg for Silence"
 Born From Pain – War – vocals on "Behind Enemy Lines"
 Kill II This – Deviate – backing vocals on "The Flood"
 Extortion – Loose Screws – Guest Vocals on "Grind to a Halt"
 Volbeat – Beyond Hell/Above Heaven – Guest vocals on "Evelyn"
 Short Sharp Shock – Problems to the Answer – Guest vocals on "The Kill Floor, ROAR, Here Comes the Neighbourhood"
 Liquorbox (Canadian Country Band) – Gotta Get Gone – Guest vocals on "Busted Up And Broken Down"
  (Italian deathgrind band) – Breathing Instructions – Guest vocals on "Copy/Paste"
 Buzzard Dust - Buzzard Dust – Guest vocals on "Blue Blood"
 Bloodbath - Survival of the Sickest - Guest vocals on "Putrefying Corpse"

References

External links
 

Living people
1969 births
Death metal musicians
20th-century English male singers
21st-century English male singers
Napalm Death members
English heavy metal singers
English socialists
English atheists
Musicians from Birmingham, West Midlands
Grindcore musicians
British republicans